The 3rd César Awards ceremony, presented by the Académie des Arts et Techniques du Cinéma, honoured the best French films of 1977 and took place on 4 February 1978 at the Salle Pleyel in Paris. The ceremony was chaired by Jeanne Moreau and hosted by Pierre Tchernia for the third time. Providence won the award for Best Film.

Winners and nominees

Films with multiple nominations and awards 

The following films received multiple nominations:

The following films received multiple awards:

See also 
 50th Academy Awards
 31st British Academy Film Awards

References

External links
 Official website
 
 3rd César Awards at AlloCiné

1978
1978 film awards
Cesar